Old Hickory Boulevard is a historic road that encircles Nashville, Tennessee, lying entirely within Davidson County. Originally the road, aided by ferries, formed a nearly unbroken loop around the city. Just over half the distance––is part of several Tennessee state highways, including SR 45, SR 171, SR 251, and SR 254. Unsigned concurrencies exist very briefly along US 31E, US 41/US 70S, and SR 100.

Route description
The road is named for President Andrew Jackson, who was nicknamed "Old Hickory." The road intersects with each of Interstates 24, 65, and 40 in the Nashville area twice, contributing to the misconception that there are many roads in Nashville using this name, rather than one broken ring around the city.

The route is effectively split into a northern half and a southern half by interruptions caused by the Cumberland River and the Stones River (via Percy Priest Lake). The section of Old Hickory Boulevard south of Hermitage to Antioch was interrupted by the creation of Percy Priest Lake and is now partially underwater. The gap created by the lake effectively merged the identity of Old Hickory Boulevard with Bell Road. Bell Road continues eastward and later northeastward along SR 254 until the termination of SR 254 at Murfreesboro Pike (US 41/US 70S). Bell Road continues northward to Stewarts Ferry Pike and then crosses J. Percy Priest Dam before intersecting Old Hickory Boulevard in the southern part of Hermitage; this provides an unbroken link from the southern half to the northern half of Old Hickory Boulevard. Meanwhile, the signed route of Old Hickory Boulevard turns southward away from the SR 254/Bell Road alignment and weaves through neighborhoods before emerging along SR 171 and intersecting I-24 in southern part of Antioch near the Davidson–Rutherford county line. From there, it proceeds north-northeast toward Murfreesboro Pike (US 41/US 70S), splitting from SR 171 (which continues northward as Hobson Pike) and intersecting Murfreesboro Pike just south of the SR 171/Hobson Pike crossing. It continues northeastward and merges with Lavergne-Couchville Pike about  later, continuing northeast to the Four Corners Recreation Area, near where the old route of the road enters what is now the lake.

West of Antioch, the southern segment continues along SR 254, intersecting all major north–south arteries extending south from Downtown Nashville through Brentwood and Forest Hills: Nolensville Pike (US 31A/US 41A), Edmonson Pike, I-65, Franklin Pike (US 31), Granny White Pike, and Hillsboro Pike (US 431). SR 254 terminates at Highway 100 near Warner Parks; Old Hickory Boulevard continues northward from Highway 100 after a brief concurrency. It intersects US 70S in Bellevue, where SR 251 becomes concurrent. The road continues northward to intersect I-40 and Charlotte Pike (US 70) before terminating at River Road Pike and Old Charlotte Pike in northern part of Bellevue. Old Hickory Boulevard south of US 70 and the section to the northeast renamed Annex Avenue never aligned with each other.

On the north side of the river, Old Hickory Boulevard terminates at the former Cleeces Ferry ramp, which is now a boat launch. From there, it traverses northward as a two-lane road through Bells Bend before intersecting Ashland City Highway (SR 12) in the Scottsboro area. Continuing northward, the route passes through the slightly rugged terrain of northwest Davidson County, intersecting Eatons Creek Road near Beaman Park and Clarksville Pike (US 41A) shortly afterward. Old Hickory Boulevard then turns eastward and southeastward as it weaves its way to the Whites Creek area, where it intersects Whites Creek Pike (US 431). SR 45 begins here and forms a concurrency with Old Hickory Boluvard. After serving as the southern terminus of Lickton Pike at Whites Creek High School, the road briefly becomes four-laned at the I-24 interchange. After passing Brick Church Pike and Dickerson Pike (US 41/US 31W), where SR 45 becomes permanently four-laned, the road has an interchange with I-65 and enters Madison. At the intersection with Gallatin Pike (US 31E), Old Hickory Boulevard leaves its concurrency with SR 45 and shifts one block south (SR 45 continues east simply as "SR 45"). It continues due east as a two-lane road along its original alignment through Madison before the designation jumps back to the adjacent SR 45 at the bridge across the Cumberland River. The original alignment becomes Sandhurst Drive at the river and turns sharply to the southwest (the former alignment intersected Sandhurst Drive before continuing across the bridge–this approximately  segment was closed with the construction of the four-lane SR 45).

Entering Old Hickory, Old Hickory Boulevard leaves its concurrency with SR 45 once again, with the route continuing southeast as Robinson Road. The alignment of Old Hickory Boulevard follows Bridgeway Avenue before regaining designation at the intersection of Bridgeway Avenue and Swinging Bridge Road at the former DuPont plant. This segment continues southeastward to Donelson Avenue, where the designation ends. The alignment follows Hadley Avenue south to SR 45, where Robinson Road ends and Old Hickory Boulevard regains its designation and concurrency with SR 45. Continuing southeast, the road passes through Lakewood before turning south, passing The Hermitage estate. It enters the town of Hermitage, intersecting Lebanon Pike (US 70), Central Pike (SR 265), and I-40, which serves as the southern/eastern terminus of SR 45.

History

Old Hickory Boulevard formerly formed a near-complete loop around the city of Nashville. Major road projects combined with the gap created by the lake effectively merged the identity of Old Hickory Boulevard with Bell Road, with Bell Road now connecting the southern segment in western Antioch with the northern segment in southern Hermitage. One of the ferries used on the road, Cleeces Ferry, located on Bells Bend northeast of Bellevue, closed in 1990 after the opening of the Andrew B. Gibson Bridge on Tennessee State Route 155/Briley Parkway. In Madison, SR 45 was constructed with a four-lane segment just north of the old alignment. This resulted in Old Hickory Boulevard seemingly shifting a block south of SR 45 between Gallatin Pike (US 31E) and the Cumberland River, as the designation continues to follow the original alignment. Sandhurst Drive now serves as a continuation of the old alignment (when the designation of Old Hickory Boulevard jumps over to SR 45 at the river); it formerly terminated at Old Hickory Boulevard as the former alignment continued from Madison to the bridge, a segment that was closed and removed when the four-lane SR 45 was routed immediately north of the intersection.

Major junctions

Northern segment

Southern segment

References

History of Nashville, Tennessee
Roads in Tennessee
Transportation in Nashville, Tennessee